Suan Yai is one of the ten subdistricts (tambon) of Mueang Nonthaburi District, in Nonthaburi Province, Thailand. The subdistrict is bounded by (clockwise from north) Bang Kraso, Talat Khwan, Bang Khen, Wong Sawang, and across the Chao Phraya River, Bang Kruai, Bang Phai, Bang Si Mueang and Sai Ma subdistricts. The whole area of the subdistrict is covered by Nonthaburi City Municipality. In 2020 it had a total population of 33,706 people.

References

External links
Website of Nonthaburi City Municipality

Tambon of Nonthaburi province
Populated places in Nonthaburi province